Distocyclus guchereauae is a species of glass knifefishes found in the Litany River and the Tampoc River, in the Maroni River drainage in French Guiana.

References

Sternopygidae
Fish of Brazil
Taxa named by François-Jean Meunier
Taxa named by Michel Louis Arthur Marie Ange François Jégu
Taxa named by Philippe Keith
Fish described in 2014